Millan Vaso (born 1951) is an Albanian footballer. He played in three matches for the Albania national football team in 1973.

References

External links
 

1951 births
Living people
Albanian footballers
Albania international footballers
Place of birth missing (living people)
Association footballers not categorized by position